Francisco de Orellana is a town in the Loreto Region where there is a statue in memory of Francisco de Orellana, the first European who discovered the Amazon river in 1542.

Populated places in the Loreto Region